In differential geometry and dynamical systems, a closed geodesic on a Riemannian manifold is a geodesic that returns to its starting point with the same tangent direction. It may be formalized as the projection of a closed orbit of the geodesic flow on the tangent space of the manifold.

Definition
In a Riemannian manifold (M,g), a closed geodesic is a curve  that is a geodesic for the metric g and is periodic.

Closed geodesics can be characterized by means of a variational principle. Denoting by  the space of smooth 1-periodic curves on M, closed geodesics of period 1 are precisely the critical points of the energy function , defined by

 

Thus every closed geodesic on M gives rise to an infinite sequence of critical points of the energy E.

Examples
On the unit sphere  with the standard round Riemannian metric, every great circle is an example of a closed geodesic. Thus, on the sphere, all geodesics are closed. On a smooth surface topologically equivalent to the sphere, this may not be true, but there are always at least three simple closed geodesics; this is the theorem of the three geodesics. Manifolds all of whose geodesics are closed have been thoroughly investigated in the mathematical literature. On a compact hyperbolic surface, whose fundamental group has no torsion, closed geodesics are in one-to-one correspondence with non-trivial conjugacy classes of elements in the Fuchsian group of the surface.

See also
Lyusternik–Fet theorem
Theorem of the three geodesics
Curve-shortening flow
Selberg trace formula
Selberg zeta function
Zoll surface

References

Besse, A.: "Manifolds all of whose geodesics are closed", Ergebisse Grenzgeb. Math., no. 93, Springer, Berlin, 1978.

Differential geometry
Dynamical systems
Geodesic (mathematics)